Conscience is the fourth album by Womack & Womack, released in 1988, containing the hit single "Teardrops". The backing musicians were entitled the Mountain Man Band.

Track listing 
All tracks by Cecil Womack and Linda Womack (credited as Dr Rue and the Gypsy Wave Banner).
 "Conscious of My Conscience" – 6:10
 "MPB (Missin' Persons Bureau)" – 3:58
 "Friends (So Called)" – 5:43
 "Slave (Just for Love)" – 5:02
 "Teardrops" – 5:04
 "Good Man Monologue" – 4:31
 "Life's Just a Ballgame" – 4:24
 "I am Love" – 2:43
 "Celebrate the World" – 4:14

Personnel

Performance 
 Joel Bryant – keyboards
 Ricky Fataar – drums
 Cecil Womack – vocals, background vocals, guitar, keyboards
 Earl "The Pearl" Womack – drums
 Linda Womack – vocals, background vocals, guitar, keyboards
 Naomi Womack – background vocals
 Travis B. Womack – bass guitar
 The Virginia Womack Family – background vocals
 Dashiell Rae – backing vocals
 Lyn Gerald – backing vocals

Production 
 Chris Blackwell – producer
 Carol Friedman – art direction and photography
 Sue Keston – design
 Vince McCartney – engineer

Charts

Weekly charts

Year-end charts

Sales and certifications

References 

Womack & Womack albums
1988 albums
Albums produced by Chris Blackwell
Island Records albums